NetDay (1995–2004) was an event established in 1995 that "called on high-tech companies to commit resources to schools, libraries, and clinics worldwide so that they could connect to the Internet". It was developed by John Gage (then-chief science officer at Sun Microsystems) and activist Michael Kaufman. They approached Delaine Eastin, California's State Superintendent of Public Instruction, to put together the first event in California. The first official NetDay was held in 1996.

In 2005, NetDay merged with Project Tomorrow (tomorrow.org), a California nonprofit involved with math and science education. The organization is continuing to work with schools to improve the use of technology in education.

Overview
NetDay was established to take place over the course of one Saturday, whereby designated schools would receive full connection to the Internet. Activities were coordinated at the website netday.org. The HTML Writers Guild (quoting the NetDay FAQ) defined the day as an:

Some argued that access to the Internet should not be a priority when schools lack even basic resources like library books (although in many cases the project added needed materials and efforts to computing projects already underway).

NetDay '96

The first NetDay was held on March 9, 1996. NetDay '96 created considerable excitement amongst participating schools. The day was organized via the website netday96.com. 20,000 volunteers helped to wire 20 percent of California schools to the Internet. 2,500 wiring kits were donated by telephone companies. Of the first event, John Gage commented, "NetDay96 is a demonstration of what can happen when people coalesce around a community project [...] In one day, we can begin to reverse California's abysmal record of putting technology into its classrooms."

President Bill Clinton and Vice President Al Gore were also involved with NetDay '96, spending the day at Ygnacio Valley High School, as part of the drive to connect California public schools to the Internet. In a speech given at YVH, Clinton stated that he was excited to see that his challenge the previous September to "Californians to connect at least 20 percent of your schools to the Information Superhighway by the end of this school year" was met. Clinton also described this event as part of a time of "absolutely astonishing transformation; a moment of great possibility. All of you know that the information and technology explosion will offer to you and to the young people of the future more opportunities and challenges than any generation of Americans has ever seen". Clinton acknowledged the support of the State Superintendent of Public Instruction Delaine Eastin, Lieutenant Governor Gray Davis, Senator Barbara Boxer and Representative George Miller.

In a prepared statement, Gore added that NetDay was part of one of the major goals of the Clinton administration, which was "to give every child in America access to high quality educational technology by the dawn of the new century." Gore also stated that the administration planned "to connect every classroom to the Internet by the year 2000".

Another NetDay was held that same year in October in Silicon Valley, involving 80 companies and approximately 3,500 volunteers helping to network 172 schools. The campaign was called Smart Schools NetDay II and was coordinated by Smart Valley, Inc., a 501(c)(4) nonprofit organization, part of the initiatives at Joint Venture: Silicon Valley.

NetDay Activities 

On April 28, 1998, Gore honored numerous volunteers who had been involved with NetDay and "who helped connect students to the Internet in 700 of the poorest schools in the country" via "an interactive online session with children across the country." Volunteers continued to play a central role in NetDay school wiring activities, and by the end of 2001, NetDay events were held in 40 states and engaged more than 500,000 volunteers to wire more than 75,000 classrooms across the USA. Archived versions of the NetDay Web site, netday.org, say that NetDay events were planned for March 20, 1999, April 8, 2000, October 28, 2000, March 31, 2001 and October 27, 2001.

In its last four years of operation, NetDay changed its focus from one or two days a year to wire schools to the Internet. Its new events and activities included collaborating with Join Hands Day in 2002, and three new initiatives: NetDay TechDay, NetDay Speakup Day and TESS ― Technology Enhancing Student Success.

In February 2006, NetDay merged with Project Tomorrow, a national education nonprofit organization.

See also
 eCorps
 Geekcorps
 Geeks Without Bounds
 ICVolunteers
 Inveneo
 NetCorps
One Laptop per Child
 Peace Corps
 Random Hacks of Kindness
 United Nations Information Technology Service (UNITeS)

References

External links
Business Wire. "Quantum supports Milpitas High School as part of statewide NetDay '96 initiative; volunteer time and hard disk drives donated to bring school on-line", March 7, 1996.
Clinton, Bill and Al Gore. "President Clinton and Vice President Gore Participate in NetDay". April 19, 1997.
Clinton Presidential Library, "NetDay '96 Speeches at Ygnacio Valley High School, Concord, California", March 9, 1996.
Cronin, Caitlin. "Same Approach, Different Contexts:Exploring the International Impact of NetDay." AARE Conference, Adelaide 1998.
Dornin, Rusty. "2,000 California schools get wired Net Day connects students to cyberspace." CNN, March 9, 1996.
Purdum, Todd. " Pursuing a Theme, Clinton Helps Schools Go On-Line." New York Times,  March 10, 1996.

History of the Internet
Non-profit technology
Digital divide
Charities